Elachista aurita is a moth of the family Elachistidae. It is found in the southern parts of the eastern coast of Queensland.

The forewings of the males are metallic blue basally with shiny dark bronzy brown scales distally. Females have similar forewings but have three silvery white markings. The hindwings of both sexes are dark grey.

The larvae feed on Oplismenus species. They mine the leaves of their host plant. Pupation takes place outside of the mine on a leaf of the host plant.

References

Moths described in 2011
aurita
Moths of Australia
Taxa named by Lauri Kaila